Johnny Montantes, alias Jumpin' Johnny, (June 10, 1969 – September 28, 1997) was a lightweight professional boxer from Minnesota.

Personal life
Montantes was from Saint Paul, Minnesota. He named his son "Marciano" in honor of heavyweight great Rocky Marciano.

Professional career
Montantes' career began in 1990 with a win against Norberto Riviera followed by a loss to Jose Vilarino. There was initially no hint of the success to come. However, following the loss to Vilarino, Montantes put together a string of 22 straight wins against ever-improving competition. His last two fights were losses to well-known fighters Acelino Freitas and James Crayton. His final record was 28 wins (22 by knockout) and 4 losses.

Death
On the night of September 26, 1997, Montantes was fighting James Crayton in Las Vegas, Nevada. Knocked out violently in the fifth round, Montantes suffered a brain injury and never regained consciousness. Doctors removed him from life support two days later.

Notes

1969 births
1997 deaths
Boxers from Saint Paul, Minnesota
Deaths due to injuries sustained in boxing
Sports deaths in Nevada
American male boxers
Lightweight boxers